Gautier Serre (born June 5, 1984), better known by his stage name Igorrr, is a French musician. Under the Igorrr alias, he combines a variety of disparate genres, including black metal, baroque music, breakcore, and trip hop, into a singular sound. Serre is also part of the groups Whourkr and Corpo-Mente. The Igorrr project became a full band with the addition of vocalists Aphrodite Patoulidou and JB Le Bail, plus the drummer Sylvain Bouvier and the guitarist Martyn Clément.

History

Solo work (2005–2016)
Serre plays piano, drums, and guitar and primarily uses Steinberg Cubase for recording. He named his band after a pet gerbil called Igorr that he had as a child, adding the extra "r" to "make it harder to pronounce." Serre claims to have synesthesia, in his case perceiving music as colors. In 2011 interview, he spoke of the origin of his solo project:

Igorrr self-released a demo album, Poisson Soluble (2006) and Moisissure (2008, Acroplane Recordings), which gained the attention of label Ad Noiseam. His debut album Nostril was released in 2010, alongside a companion EP Baroquecore. Both demos were reissued in 2011.
Igorrr's second album Hallelujah was released in 2012. It featured collaboration from Mayhem guitarist Teloch and classical singer Laure Le Prunenec. Igorrr's pet chicken, Patrick, gained notoriety for "playing" the piano (Serre would put chicken feed on corresponding keys the chicken would peck at.) Serre won a GoPro award for film making for a video of Patrick playing filmed with a GoPro.

Expansion to full band (2017–present)

In February 2017, Igorrr signed with Metal Blade Records. His third album Savage Sinusoid, was released on June 16, 2017. The album was recorded over five years by a collective of musicians. The album was preceded by the single "ieuD". Unlike previous Igorrr albums, it did not feature any samples. It featured collaboration with members of Cattle Decapitation and Secret Chiefs 3. The album received positive critical reception, Metal Injection awarded it "The Bat Shit Crazy Album Of The Year Award", and a perfect 10/10 score, while AllMusic gave the album 4 out of 5 stars. Metal Hammer gave the album 4 out of 5 stars as well. The album charted in Belgium on the Ultratop Flanders chart, reaching #173.

Igorrr toured North America for the first time in 2018. In June 2018, Igorrr supported Ministry on their 2018 North American tour. The live show features drummer Sylvain Bouvier and vocalists Laure Le Prunenec and Laurent Lunoir, alongside Serre on vocals and programming.

Igorrr has also performed at several other festivals, including Heavy Montréal festival, Dour Festival (three times, in 2014, 2015 and 2017), Roadburn Festival, Europavox, Montreux Jazz Festival, Metaldays, Durbuy Rock Festival, Motocultor Festival, Download Festival, Brutal Assault, Hellfest Open Air, FortaRock, and Copenhell, among others. Igorrr also had a short film shown at the Orlando Film Festival. They also performed at a rock festival hosted by the opera company Opéra national du Rhin in 2017.

Style and influences
Igorrr's sound combines breakbeats, heavy metal riffs, extreme tempo changes, and operatic singing coupled with screaming/growling, among other elements, to create what AllMusic describes as "an intense, disturbing, and undeniably distinct experience". The project's musical sources include black metal, death metal, industrial metal, progressive metal, classical music (especially Baroque music), Balkan music, breakcore, and trip hop. It has provoked labels such as "Baroquecore" and has been described as Dadaist.

In a 2017 interview, Serre said of the origin of Igorrr: "It started when I was a teenager looking for a band or an artist destroying all the limits of music, a band able to bring what all the boring mainstream bands could not bring." Serre listed classical composers Frédéric Chopin, Johann Sebastian Bach, Jean-Philippe Rameau, and Domenico Scarlatti, alongside contemporary acts Taraf de Haïdouks, Cannibal Corpse, Meshuggah, Aphex Twin, Mr. Bungle (as well as other Mike Patton projects), and Portishead as influences in the early days.

Collaborations

With other musicians 
Serre was part of Whourkr from 2005 up until 2013 when the group split up into their individual projects. Igorrr released the Maigre EP, a collaboration with French artist Ruby My Dear. Starting in 2015, Serre is part of Corpo-Mente, where he works with vocalist Laure Le Prunenec. Their first self-titled album was on the label Blood Music and recorded at Improve Tone Studio in Lezoux, France. He also collaborated with fellow breakcore artist Bong-Ra Serre worked with The Algorithm on Brute Force.

Serre has remixed songs for Morbid Angel (released on  Illud Divinum Insanus – The Remixes) and Meshuggah.

Jeannette: The Childhood of Joan of Arc 
Igorrr composed half of the soundtrack to the musical film Jeannette: The Childhood of Joan of Arc directed by Bruno Dumont. The film was screened at the 2017 Cannes Film Festival. The soundtrack was nominated for Best Music at the 23rd Lumières Awards. According to Serre, his initial compositions had a "medieval atmosphere", before the director told him to "just do Igorrr". The score is described as "electro-pop with a dose of heavy metal" and techno-pop.

Band members
Current members
 Gautier Serre – guitar, programming, instrumentations & vocals 
 Sylvain Bouvier – drums 
 JB Le Bail – vocals 
 Martyn Clément – guitar 
 Marthe Alexandre - mezzo-soprano vocals 
 Patrick - chicken vocals, piano 

Former members
 Laurent Lunoir - vocals 
 Laure Le Prunenec - vocals 
 Aphrodite Patoulidou – soprano vocals

Discography

Studio albums
Nostril (2010)
Hallelujah (2012)
Savage Sinusoid (2017)
Spirituality and Distortion (2020)

Demos
Poisson Soluble (2006)
Moisissure (2008)

EPs
Baroquecore (2010)
Maigre with Ruby My Dear (2014)

with Whourkr
Demo (2005)
Naät (2007)
Concrete (2008, reiussed 2010)
4247 Snare Drums (2012)
Naät + Concrete (2013, vinyl reissue)

with Corpo-Mente
Corpo-Mente (2014)

References

External links 
Official website

Living people
French musicians
1984 births
Avant-garde metal musical groups
Musical groups established in 2005
French heavy metal musical groups
French industrial metal musical groups
Breakcore